Cataclysmo and the Time Boys is weekly web serial produced by New Renaissance Pictures. It is distributed by WebSerials.com and is available on YouTube and the Vuze network. Cataclysmo and the Time Boys consists of 24 episodes, each about 5 minutes in length. As of October 2009, the serial had more than 1 million views on YouTube. Cataclysmo and the Time Boys premiered on July 27, 2007.

Plot

Two heroes from a war-weary future travel back in time to stop the war in its origins. The 'Time Boys' confront the evil Dr. Crankshaft, evil monkeys and ally themselves with the lovely Samantha.

Cast
Johnny Zanzibar (played by Brian Walton)
Bucky Stallion (played by Chris Hartwell)
Samantha (played by Erin Sullivan)
Dr. Crankshaft (played by Jesse GrothOlson)
H.G. Welles (played by Nate Bell)
Mildred Crankshaft (played by Kenlyn Kanouse)
Reporter (played by Shevaun Kastl)
Surfer Dude (played by Gabe Renfro)
Government Dudes (played by Derek Houck & Jonathan Nation)
Steve the Neighbor (played by Nathan Jeffers)
Private Bobby (played by Anthony Parisi)
Store Clerk (played by Thomas Minelga)

Episodes
The following is a list of episodes from the popular web serial, Cataclysmo and the Time Boys.

The series ran from July 27, 2007 through January 18, 2008.

Season 1

Reception and Sequel
The serial was well-received on its release, spawning a sequel in 2008. Web series critics praised the series for its clever humor, fun tone, and memorable visual effects. The sequel, entitled Cataclysmo and the Battle for Earth, premiered April 4, 2008. Brian Walton, Chris Hartwell, Erin Sullivan, and Nate Bell reprised their roles from the first serial. Impressing critics with its bold and epic style, Battle for Earth maintained the fun tone of the original, while pushing the story in unexpected new directions. The sequel was directed by Anthony Parisi and written by Kevin Christensen, Anthony Parisi, & Joshua Sikora.

See also
 The Black Dawn

External links 
 Official Site
 Cataclysmo on YouTube
 Cataclysmo and the Time Boys on the Internet Movie Database

References

American comedy web series
American science fiction web series